Alan Lowndes (1921–1978) was a British painter known primarily for his scenes of northern life. He also spent time in St Ives, and he was a close friend of many of the St Ives School artists.

Lowndes was born in Heaton Norris, Lancashire, a suburb of Stockport in 1921, the fifth child of a railway clerk. He left school at 14, and was apprenticed to a decorator. In World War II he saw active service in the South-west Asia and Italy. After the war he studied painting at night school, but was largely self-taught. He began to achieve success in the late 1950s and early 1960s in the period when northern writers such as Stan Barstow, John Braine and Alan Sillitoe were also coming to the fore. He had one man exhibitions in Manchester, London and New York and is represented in many public collections. Although often compared to L. S. Lowry, he is considered by Terry Frost to be a greater painter. Alan Lowndes died in Gloucestershire in 1978.

Grayson Perry selected work by Lowndes for his Unpopular Culture exhibition (2008).

In 2021, the centenary of Lowndes’ birth was marked by an exhibition at the Crane Kalman Gallery, London. In reviewing this exhibition David Nowell Smith of the University of East Anglia said “It’s time for Alan Lowndes to emerge from L.S. Lowry’s shadow”.

See also

 List of St. Ives artists

References

External links 
 
 Works by Lowndes in the Tate collection
 Website containing press cuttings about Lowndes

1921 births
People from Stockport
20th-century English painters
English male painters
St Ives artists
1978 deaths
British expatriates in Italy
British military personnel of World War II
20th-century English male artists